Edward Arnold "Ted" Stickles (born April 7, 1942) is an American former competition swimmer and former world record-holder. He was inducted into the International Swimming Hall of Fame in 1995 and into the Indiana University Hall of Fame in 1998.

Swimming career
Stickles swam with James Counsilman's Indiana University team from 1962 to 1965. At one point during his career, he and his roommate, Chet Jastremski, held a total of seven world records.  He broke a total of nine world records in the individual medley in the early 1960s.

Records
 Four world records – 400m individual medley
 Eight U.S. National AAU Championships – 200 m individual medley, 400m individual medley

Coaching career
Stickles was the head swimming coach for the Illinois Fighting Illini swimming team at the University of Illinois. He was also head coach of the LSU Tigers (1973–1980) and LSU Lady Tigers (1980) swimming and diving teams at Louisiana State University.

Personal life
Stickles now resides in Louisiana with wife and two children. His sister Terri is a former Olympic swimmer. Ted developed tendinitis in his elbow and consequently missed the 1964 Olympics – otherwise Ted and Terri would have been the first brother and sister to make an Olympic team.

See also
 List of members of the International Swimming Hall of Fame
 List of Indiana University (Bloomington) people
 World record progression 200 metres individual medley
 World record progression 400 metres individual medley

References

1942 births
Living people
American male medley swimmers
World record setters in swimming
LSU Tigers and Lady Tigers swimming coaches 
Indiana Hoosiers men's swimmers
Swimmers from San Francisco